AFCS may refer to: 

 A.F.C. Sudbury an English football team
 Advanced Facer-Canceler System, a range of machines used for sorting, labeling, coding and postage canceling of mail
 Aircraft flight control system
 Atlanta–Fulton County Stadium a former stadium in Atlanta, Georgia
 Automated fare collection system
 Automatic flight control system, commonly known as an autopilot